The Port Moresby Vipers (formerly the Port Moresby Bulldogs) are a Papua New Guinean rugby league team from Port Moresby. The team currently competes in the Papua New Guinea National Rugby League Competition.

History 
The club competed in the Panasonic Cup in 1986, 1987, 1988 and 1989. In 1990, they joined the new competition SP Cup where they won 3 premierships, up until 1995. They joined the Queensland Cup competition in 1996 and 1997. Due to the cost of transportation to and from Australia they were not invited to compete in the Queensland Cup for 1998. They returned to the SP Cup in 1999 for one season, before being demoted to the Port Moresby Domestic Competition. Another franchise Club that represented Port Moresby in the semi-professional competition was the Port Moresby Brian Bell Bulldogs.

Richard Sinamoi, William Bussil Junior, Paul Komboi, and POMRFL Chairman Solomon Ravu orchestrated the re-entry of the Vipers in the national competition, during the SP Cup transition period to Bemobile Cup in 2008. The Vipers ended with the wooden spoon in its maiden year returning to the high level national competition, but finished strongly in the following seasons (7th in 2009, and 5th in 2010). When Digicel took the naming rights of the national competition, the Vipers finished 5th in 2011, and 4th in 2012. The team eventually became premiers, winning the cup in 2013.

The club is a national and flagship identity in the metropolitan city of Port Moresby and its players are from a mixture of all provinces in the country. The club's feeder league is the Port Moresby Rugby League competition.

New South Wales Cup Bid

The Vipers are in the  process of preparing their bid to join the Knock-On Effect  NSW Cup competition in Australia. They have an Academy with the major focus on Women's and Juniors.

2023 squad

Results

SP Cup/Bemobile Cup/PNGNRL 
Winners (5): 1990, 1991, 1992, 1994, 2013
Runners up (1): 1993,

Intercity Cup since 1990 
 1990 Premiers Runner up Hagen Eagles
 1991 Premiers Runner up Hagen Eagles
 1992 Premiers Runner up My Hagen Eagles
 1993 Runners up to Goroka Lahanis
 1994 Premiers Runner up Goroka Lahanis.
 2013 Premiers Runner up Goroka Lahanis
**** 1996 Foundation Club Queensland (Channel 9 cup now Intrust Super Cup)

*" Some Original Coaches and Players

1990 Sam Kaia ( Coach)

1991 John Wagambie ( Coach)

1992 John Wagambie ( Coach)

1993 Adrian Genolagani

1994 Adrian Genolagani

 Some Original players
 Johnson Tia
 John Oeka
 Kes Paglipari
 Tuksy Karu
 Sauna Babaga
 John Oeka
 Richard Wagambie
 Joe Gispe
 James Naipao
 Kera Ngaffin
 Luke Waldiat
 Wata Sauna

See also

References

External links
 

Rugby league in Papua New Guinea
Papua New Guinean rugby league teams
Rugby clubs established in 1986
1986 establishments in Papua New Guinea
Port Moresby
Diaspora sports clubs in Australia
Proposed sports teams
Proposals in Australia